Edward Stanford (born 4 February 1985) is an English former footballer who plays for Curzon Ashton as a midfielder.

Career
Stanford began his professional career at Coventry City where he had begun as a trainee. During a two-year term with the club, he managed only one first team appearance, coming on as a 73rd-minute substitute for Dean Gordon in a 2–0 away defeat by Millwall on 4 May 2003. He was released by Coventry at the end of the 2003/04 season. Stanford had spells in Poland with Legia warsaw and Ruch Chorzow in the Polish Premier League.

Stanford now coaches at Blackburn Rovers fc Academy.

External links

1985 births
Living people
Footballers from Blackburn
English footballers
Association football midfielders
Coventry City F.C. players
Tamworth F.C. players
Legia Warsaw players
Ruch Chorzów players
Sandecja Nowy Sącz players
Promień Żary players
Nelson F.C. players
Chorley F.C. players
Curzon Ashton F.C. players
Burscough F.C. players
Radcliffe F.C. players
Stalybridge Celtic F.C. players
English Football League players
National League (English football) players
Expatriate footballers in Poland
English expatriate sportspeople in Poland